Quisenberry is a surname. Notable people with the surname include:

Clifford Quisenberry (1878–1916), American farmer and politician
Dan Quisenberry (1953–1998), American baseball player